Oligocarpus is a genus of plants in the pot marigold tribe within the sunflower family, native to Southern Africa. The species oligocarpus calendulaceus can also be found in southern Australia. 

This genus was separated from Osteospermum in 1999 after a phylogenetic study determined the group was distinct from other Osteospermum species. 

 Species
 Oligocarpus burchellii (Hook.f.) B.Nord.
 Oligocarpus calendulaceus (L.f.) Less.

 formerly included
Oligocarpus acanthospermus (DC.) Bolus - Osteospermum acanthospermum (DC.) Norl.

References 

Asteraceae genera
Calenduleae
Flora of Southern Africa